Hassan Oucheikh (born 1 January 1976) is a Moroccan boxer. He competed in the men's bantamweight event at the 2000 Summer Olympics.

References

1976 births
Living people
Moroccan male boxers
Olympic boxers of Morocco
Boxers at the 2000 Summer Olympics
Place of birth missing (living people)
Bantamweight boxers